Strangeulation is the fourteenth studio album by American rapper Tech N9ne, the fifth in his "Collabos" series. The album was released on May 6, 2014, by Strange Music. The album features guest appearances from the entire Strange Music roster, including its newest signing at the time — Murs, as well as some outside collaborators such as Tyler Lyon, Ryan Bradley, Mackenzie O'Guin, Kendall Morgan, John 5 and Serj Tankian.

Background
In April 2014, in an interview with StupidDope, Tech N9ne spoke about the inspiration behind the title of the album, saying: "Something’s always happening in Tech N9ne’s life whether it be happy, whether it be sad, whether it be madness. I’m always living it so I’m always writing. The influence behind Strangeulation is off of strangulation you know. Having the industry in a choke-hold after they hear this music. Nobody will be able to say nothing. Just all the way choked up. MURS to MayDay! to Stevie Stone to Ces Cru to Tech N9ne to Krizz Kaliko to Kutt Calhoun to Jay Rock."

Promotion
On April 29, 2014, the music video was released for "Over It" featuring Ryan Bradley. On May 8, 2014, the music video was released for "Strangeulation Cypher". On May 21, 2014, the music video was released for "Hard (A Monster Made It)". On June 25, 2014, the music video was released for "Fear" featuring Mackenzie O'Guin.

Critical response

Strangeulation was met with generally positive reviews from music critics.

David Jeffries of AllMusic gave the album three out of five stars, saying "It shouldn't be a surprise that rapper Tech N9ne's fifth album of collaborations, and 14th album overall, isn't an easy entry point for newcomers, and with the topic being Tech's "Strangulation" of the music industry, this is certainly one for the Strange Music cheerleaders. All that said, it's a Strange Music posse party that just don't stop, crackling with all the excitement of a mixtape but given that official release polish, which just increases the "boom" factor."

Steven Goldstein of HipHopDX gave the album three out of five stars, saying "Now five albums into the “Collabos” series, it would have been interesting to see Tech N9ne hook up with some of Hip Hop’s other independent heavyweights. Tech raps about seeing “me, K. Lamar and Macklemore sharing the same stage,” and while the major label aversion is understandable, Strangeulation only has so much upside without expanding beyond Strange Music. An artist so comfortable with cross-genre experimentation and forward-thinking lyricism played it surprisingly safe with the actual “collabos,” but Tech’s in-house team is more than good enough to keep the project in rotation for dedicated fans."

Eric Diep of XXL gave the album an L rating, saying: "There’s a sense of realization on Strangeulation that shows Tech’s motivated to become a part of the elite rap league that includes Eminem and Jay Z. With his latest collabo effort before Special Effects (his 15th studio album), Tech is viewed as the big homie among his peers and delivers his best work to allow them to rise to the occasion. This time around, it just seems the Technicians are the only ones listening."

Steve 'Flash' Juon of RapReviews gave the album a seven out of ten, saying "It's a good album, even an above average album, one I'd be happy I bought at the merch table whether I was showing love or not and whether it came with a collector's coin that as much as I like it I feel may get misplaced once I put this CD on the shelf. Tech fans should definitely make the investment, and it's a strong teaser for Murs' official label debut in June."

Commercial performance
The album debuted at number 5 on the Billboard 200 chart, with first-week sales of 36,000 copies in the United States. In its second week, the album dropped to number 33, selling 8,300 copies, bringing its total album sales to 44,000 copies. The album has sold 83,000 copies in the US as of October 2015.

Track listing

Personnel

 Aaron Bean – street marketing, promotions
 Anthony Devera – additional vocals
 Ben Cybulsky – acoustic guitar, bass guitarengineering, guitar, mixing
 Ben Grossi – project consultant, general management
 Bernz – featured performer
 Big Scoob – featured performer
 Braxton Flemming – merchandising
 Brent Bradley – internet marketing
 Brian Shafton – project consultant, general management
 Brotha Lynch Hung – featured performer
 Chris Handley – bass, guitar
 Cory Nielsen – production assistant
 Crystal Watson – additional vocals
 Dave Weiner – associate producer
 Dawn O'Guin – production assistant
 DJ Fresh – scratching
 Glenda Cowan – production assistant
 Go-Go Ray – drums
 Godemis – featured performer
 James Cerven – additional vocals
 Jared Coop – merchandising
 Jay Rock – featured performer
 Jeff Nelson – internet marketing
 Jose Ramirez – street marketing & promotions
 Kendall Morgan – featured performer
 Kerry Rounds – additional vocals
 Khris Rickards – writer
 Korey Lloyd – production assistant, project management
 Krizz Kaliko – featured performer
 Kutt Calhoun – featured performer
 Liquid 9 – art direction & design
 Mackenzie O'Guin – featured performer
 Manzilla Marquis Queen – writer
 Mary Harris – merchandising
 Matt Steele – additional vocals
 Michael Hollembeak – additional vocals
 Murs – featured performer
 Penny Ervin – merchandising
 Prozak – featured performer
 Richie Abbott – publicity
 Rittz – featured performer
 Robert Lieberman – legal management
 Ryan Bradley – featured performer
 Ryan Lindberg – additional vocals
 Samantha Levi – photography
 Sarah Romero – additional vocals
 Seven – producer
 Shalini Perumalla – additional vocals, writer
 Taylor Lamb – additional vocals
 Tech N9ne – primary artist, A&R
 Tom Baker – mastering
 Travis O'Guin – A&R, executive producer, skit
 Tyler Lyon – drums, featured performer, guitar, vocals
 Ubiquitous – featured performer
 Valdora Case – production assistant
 Victor Sandoval – internet marketing
 Violet Brown – production assistant
 Wrekonize – featured performer

Charts

Weekly charts

Year-end charts

References

2014 albums
Tech N9ne albums
Strange Music albums